Alfred Boiler Stanford (East Orange, New Jersey, March 12, 1900 - February 1985), Commander USNR, was an American naval officer and author; he was Deputy Commander of Mulberry A in the D-day landings

Books
 The Ground Swell (Appleton, 1923)
 A City Out of the Sea (Appleton, 1924)
 Navigator: The Story of Nathaniel Bowditch of Salem (William Morrow, 1928)
 Invitation to Danger (William Morrow, 1929)
 Flag in the Wind (William Morrow, 1930)
 Men, Fish & Boats (William Morrow, 1934)
 Pleasures of Sailing (Simon & Schuster, 1943)
 Force Mulberry: The Planning and Installation of the Artificial Harbor off U. S. Normandy Beaches in World War II (William Morrow, 1951)
 Boatman's Handbook: Ninety-six Jobs You Can Do on Your Own Boat (Motorboat Publications, 1957)
 Far Horizons: Adventures in Cruising by Members of the Cruising Club of America, edited by Alfred Stanford, David L. Bacon, and Charles H. Vilas (Cruising Club of America, 1971)

External links
Amherst College biographical record, 1963
Chicago Tribune Obituary

1900 births
1985 deaths
Writers from East Orange, New Jersey
20th-century American novelists
American male novelists
20th-century American male writers
Novelists from New Jersey